Lovesick is a 2014 American comedy film directed by Luke Matheny and written by Dean Young. The film stars Matt LeBlanc, Ali Larter, Rachael Harris, Chevy Chase, Ashley Williams and Kristen Johnston. The film was released on February 6, 2015, by Gravitas Ventures.

Plot

It is the story of Charlie Darby, who has everything going for him: a great job, friends, family, the whole package. The one thing Charlie doesn't have is love, because every time he gets close, he goes clinically insane. When he meets the perfect girl, Charlie must overcome his psychosis to claim his chance at true love.

Cast 
 Matt LeBlanc as Charlie Darby
 Ali Larter as Molly Kingston
 Rachael Harris as Roberta
 Chevy Chase as  	Lester
 Ashley Williams as Felecia
 Kristen Johnston as Katherine
 Carsen Warner as Timmy Clark
 Adam Rodríguez as Jason
 Brian Drolet as Josh
 Jennifer Rhodes as Mary Kingston
 Louise Griffiths as Jacinda
 Scott Michael Morgan as Will
 Elizabeth Ho as Tanya
 Raymond Ochoa as Shane
 Connie Sawyer as Nana Bebe
 Tatyana Ranson as Student
 Rebecca Gibson as Bee

Release
Lovesick premiered on April 24, 2014, at the opening night movie of the 15th annual Newport Beach Film Festival.

Reception
Lovesick received mixed reviews from critics. On Rotten Tomatoes, the film has a rating of 29% based on 14 reviews, with a rating of 2.87/10. On Metacritic, the film has a score of 31 out of 100, based on 6 critics, indicating "generally unfavorable reviews".

References

External links 
 

2014 films
Films set in Los Angeles
Films shot in Los Angeles
2014 comedy films
American comedy films
2014 directorial debut films
2010s English-language films
2010s American films